The World Scout Moot is an event for senior branches of Scouting (traditionally called Rovers) and other young adult Scouts, gathering up to 5,000 people. Moots provide an opportunity for young adults in Scouting to meet, with the objective of improving their international understanding as citizens of the world. Moots are held every four years and are organized by the World Organization of the Scout Movement (WOSM).

Participants must be 18–25 years old at the time of the event. Scouts who are 26 or older can take part as International Service Team (IST) volunteer staff.

History 
Rover Moots were taking place at provincial, national and international levels in the UK, Australia and Canada from the mid-1920s.

The first World Rover Moot was held in 1931 at Kandersteg, Switzerland, with following events held almost every four years until 1961, when the 7th World Rover Moot took place in Melbourne, Australia. Originally entitled the "World Rover Moot", the Moot was replaced by World Moot Years between 1965 and 1982. This was done with the aim of increasing the number of events and accessibility to Rovers. 

In 1985, after lobbying led by Australia, the World Scout Conference decided to reinstate the World Scout Moot to the calendar of world Scouting events, with the naming changed to reflect that not all countries had continued with a Rover section, notably the UK and the USA. At the World Scout Conference in January 1988, bids were presented by Australia and Switzerland, with Australia awarded the 8th World Scout Moot for Dec 1990/Jan 1991, and Switzerland granted the 9th World Scout Moot for July 1992. In 1993 it was decided to hold future Moots every four years. 

The 10th World Scout Moot was hosted by Sweden in 1993, the 11th World Scout Moot by Mexico in 2000, and the 12th World Scout Moot by Taiwan in 2004.  After originally scheduled for 2008 in Mozambique, the 13th World Scout Moot was held in Kenya in 2010 – the first ever such event to take place in Africa.

The 14th World Scout Moot was hosted by Canada in 2013, while the 15th World Scout Moot was held in Iceland in the summer of 2017. The 16th World Scout Moot was due to be in Ireland in 2021, however due to the COVID-19 pandemic the event was postponed to 2022 and subsequently cancelled. The next World Scout Moot will be hosted by Portugal in 2025.

List of Moots

See also
 World Scout Indaba

References

External links
 
 
 
 
 
 
 

Scouting events
Scouting jamborees
Recurring events established in 1931
Quadrennial events